De los Reyes is a Spanish name of religious origin, meaning 'of the kings', with reference to the Biblical Magi. Notable people and places with the name include:
 
People
Andres (Andy) De Los Reyes (born 1978), American Psychologist
Antonio de los Reyes Correa (1665–1758), Puerto Rican native who served in the Spanish Army
Baltasar de los Reyes (1606–1673), Spanish Catholic bishop
Christina de los Reyes (born 1994), Filipino soccer player
Cosme Gómez Tejada de los Reyes (died c.1661), Spanish writer, poet and dramatist
Daniel de los Reyes (born 1962), American percussionist
Diego de los Reyes Balmaseda (fl.1690–1733), Spanish merchant and Governor of Paraguay
Geronimo B. de los Reyes Jr. (1936–2020), Filipino entrepreneur, philanthropist and art collector
Hugo de los Reyes Chávez (born 1933), Venezuelan politician
Isabelo de los Reyes (1864–1938), Filipino writer, activist, and politician
Jeny de los Reyes Aguilar (1977–2010), Mexican politician
John Carlos de los Reyes (born 1970), Filipino politician
José de los Reyes Berreyesa (1785–1846), landowner in California (New Spain)
Juan de los Reyes (c.1652–1676), Spanish Catholic priest and evangelist killed in Guam.
Kamar de los Reyes (born 1967), Cuban-Puerto Rican theatre, television and film actor
Maryo J. de los Reyes (1952–2018), Filipino film and television director
Samu de los Reyes (born 1992), Spanish soccer player
Thiago de Los Reyes (born 1989), Brazilian actor
Virgilio de los Reyes, Filipino lawyer and administrator
Walfredo de los Reyes, Cuban percussionist and educator
 
Places
Alcázar de los Reyes Cristianos, castle in Córdoba, Spain
Amatlán de los Reyes, municipality in Veracruz, Mexico
Church of Santa María de los Reyes, Laguardia, Spain
Monastery of San Juan de los Reyes, Franciscan monastery in Toledo, Spain
Palacio de los Reyes de Navarra (disambiguation)
Parque de Los Reyes, urban park in Santiago, Chile
Rancho Punta de los Reyes, Mexican land grant in California
San Sebastián de los Reyes, municipality in Madrid, Spain
UD San Sebastián de los Reyes, Spanish soccer team
Villaseco de los Reyes, village and municipality in western Spain

See also
Los Reyes (disambiguation)
Reyes (disambiguation)
Los Super Reyes, American musical group from Corpus Christi, Texas, USA
El Regreso de los Reyes, debut studio album by Mexican-American cumbia group Cruz Martínez y Los Super Reyes

Spanish-language surnames